Cnephasia delnoyana is a species of moth of the family Tortricidae. It is found in Portugal and Spain, where it has been recorded from Algarve and Almeria.

The wingspan is 12 mm for males and 13–15 mm for females. The forewings are fuscous grey with
indistinct, somewhat darker fascia.

Etymology
The species is named for M. Delnoye, who first collected the species.

References

Moths described in 2012
delnoyana